Marcus Sven Erland Hasselborg (born 7 January 1986 in Stockholm) is a Swedish actor and curler. He played second for Sweden at the 2006 World Men's Curling Championships, and he finished in 2nd place when he participated at the 2008 Men's Svenska Mästerskapet curling final in Örnsköldsvik. He works as a high school teacher at Procivitas Privata Gymnasium Karlberg.

Filmography
2004 - Hip! Hip! Hora!
2000 - Den bästa sommaren
1999 - Tsatsiki, morsan och polisen

References

External links
 
 
 

1986 births
Swedish male curlers
Swedish curling champions
Living people
Swedish male actors
Sportspeople from Stockholm